Suppressor of tumorigenicity 14 protein, also known as matriptase, is a protein that in humans is encoded by the ST14 gene. ST14 orthologs have been identified in most mammals for which complete genome data are available.

Function 

Matriptase is an epithelial-derived, integral membrane serine protease. This protease forms a complex with the Kunitz-type serine protease inhibitor, HAI-1, and is found to be activated by sphingosine-1-phosphate. This protease has been shown to cleave and activate hepatocyte growth factor/scatter factor, and urokinase plasminogen activator, which suggest the function of this protease as an epithelial membrane activator for other proteases and latent growth factors.

Matriptase is a type II transmembrane serine protease expressed in most human epithelia, where it is coexpressed with its cognate transmembrane inhibitor, hepatocyte growth factor activator inhibitor (HAI)-1. Activation of the matriptase zymogen requires sequential N-terminal cleavage, activation site autocleavage, and transient association with HAI-1. Matriptase has an essential physiological role in profilaggrin processing, corneocyte maturation, and lipid matrix formation associated with terminal differentiation of the oral epithelium and the epidermis, and is also critical for hair follicle growth.  Matriptase is an 80- to 90-kDa cell surface glycoprotein with a complex modular structure that is common to all matriptases.

Clinical significance 

The expression of this protease has been associated with breast, colon, prostate, and ovarian tumors, which implicates its role in cancer invasion, and metastasis.

Matriptase and HAI expression are frequently dysregulated in human cancer, and matriptase expression that is unopposed by HAI-1 potently promotes carcinogenesis and metastatic dissemination in animal models.

References

Further reading

Extracellular matrix remodeling enzymes